Santo António (Portuguese for Saint Anthony), also known as Santo António do Príncipe, is the main settlement of the island of Príncipe in São Tomé and Príncipe. It lies on the north east coast.  It is the capital of the Autonomous Region of Príncipe. Its population is 2,620 (2012), about 35% of the island's population. The town is known for its colonial architecture and for its churches: Church of Our Lady of the Conception and Church of Our Lady of the Rosary. The town is also known for the Auto das Floripes play, which is performed by the citizens.

History

The town Santo António was founded in 1502, and was a centre of sugarcane cultivation. In 1695, the Fort of Ponta da Mina was built at the entrance of the bay of Santo António. Town and fortress were destroyed by French privateers in 1706. From 1753 until 1852, it was the colonial capital of Portuguese São Tomé and Príncipe.

Climate 
Santo António has a tropical monsoon climate, with very warm to hot temperatures and oppressive humidity year-round.

Transportation

Príncipe Airport lies 3 km north of the town. It offers flights to São Tomé International Airport six times weekly on Africa's Connection STP.

Sports
The town has the only sports facility on the island, Estádio Regional 13 de Junho. The facility is home to the football clubs Sporting Clube do Príncipe and GD Os Operários.

International relations

Santo António is twinned with:

 Aveiro, Portugal
 Faro, Portugal

References

Populated places in the Autonomous Region of Príncipe
District capitals of São Tomé and Príncipe
Populated places established in 1502
1502 establishments in Africa